Jan de Jonge (born 8 May 1963 in Emmen, Drenthe) is a retired football striker and is currently working as the manager of De Treffers. As a player, he served three clubs in the Netherlands: FC Groningen, SC Heerenveen and FC Emmen.

Managerial career
He was manager of FC Emmen, De Graafschap and he also served as assistant and interim manager of Dutch Eredivisie football club SC Heerenveen, after the dismissal of Trond Sollied during the early weeks of the 2009–10 season. In June 2013 he was appointed by Heracles.

He was sacked by Heracles on 31 August 2014 after the club lost its first four Eredivisie matches of the 2014-15 season.

References

External links
  Profile
  Profile 

1963 births
Living people
Dutch footballers
Dutch football managers
Association football forwards
Eredivisie players
Eerste Divisie players
FC Emmen players
FC Emmen managers
De Graafschap managers
FC Groningen players
SC Heerenveen players
SC Heerenveen managers
Heracles Almelo managers
Nea Salamis Famagusta FC managers
Footballers from Emmen, Netherlands
De Treffers managers
VfL Bochum non-playing staff
SC Heerenveen non-playing staff
FC Twente non-playing staff